The 1895 Open Championship was the 35th Open Championship, held 12–13 June at the Old Course at St Andrews, Fife, Scotland. Defending champion J.H. Taylor won the Championship for the second time, by four strokes from runner-up Sandy Herd.

Harry Vardon, one of the early starters, led after the first round with an 80 but had an 85 in the afternoon to finish the day on 165. Herd had the best round of the afternoon with a 77 and led overnight on 159, five strokes clear of Taylor and Andrew Kirkaldy on 164.

Herd played steadily in the third round and finished with 82 to lead on 241. Taylor, playing in the last group, scored 80 to finish on 244. The Championship resolved into a battle between Herd and Taylor. Herd started well but took seven at the 5th. Playing in wind and rain, Herd eventually scored 85 to finish on 326. Taylor need an 81 to win and after 12 holes had only taken 49 strokes. Despite taking six at the next two holes he reached the 17th tee needing to take 12 or less to win. Playing carefully he scored five at the dangerous 17th and then four at the last to win by four strokes and retain the title. His 78 was the best round of the afternoon by four shots, the next best being an 82 by Ben Sayers.

First day leaderboard
Wednesday, 12 June 1895

Final leaderboard
Source:

Thursday, 13 June 1895

References

External links
St Andrews 1895 (Official site)

The Open Championship
Golf tournaments in Scotland
Open Championship
Open Championship
Open Championship